Hitzfeld is a German surname. Notable people with the surname include:

Ottmar Hitzfeld (born 1949), German footballer and manager
Otto Hitzfeld (1898–1990), German officer in both World War I and World War II

German-language surnames